Helmut Hilpert (born 20 September 1937 – 15 June 1997) was a German football player. He spent five seasons in the Bundesliga with 1. FC Nürnberg.

Honours
 German championship: 1960–61
 Bundesliga champion: 1967–68
 DFB-Pokal winner: 1961–62

References

External links
 

1937 births
1997 deaths
German footballers
Association football defenders
1. FC Nürnberg players
SV Waldhof Mannheim players
Bundesliga players
20th-century German people